Cabrits National Park is on a peninsula at the north end of the Caribbean island of Dominica, north of Portsmouth. The park protects tropical forest, coral reefs and wetlands. There are hiking trails and an English garrison called Fort Shirley (Dominica)|Fort Shirley]]. Cabrits National Park occupies 1,313 acres (531 ha) and was established in 1986.

Cabrits is an extinct volcano that was once its own island, separate from mainland Dominica.  It was connected to Dominica by the sweeping in of material from Douglas Bay and Prince Rupert Bay.

The word Cabrits is derived from "goat" in Spanish, French and Portuguese, and is a reference to the animal that has been indigenous to Cabrits. Goats were introduced to the island by sailors, who set them free on the island to grow, so that there would be meat available when they returned.

Cabrits is the last stop on the Waitukubuli Trail which originates in the southern village of Scott's Head.  Segment 14 of the trail runs from Capuchin to Cabrits.

Fort Shirley

Fort Shirley was formerly a military outpost, a sterling example of its kind in the West Indies. The British began building it in 1765 as a garrison to defend north Dominica. The fort was extended by the French during their occupation of Dominica from 1778 to 1784. Georgian in style it consisted of over 50 buildings, and housed over 600 men. It was abandoned in 1854. After suffering for years, Dr. Lennox Honychurch began restoration in 1982.  Several of the buildings are completely restored, while ruins of the rest can be found scattered around the peninsula.

References

External links
The Cabrits Garrison - Dominica’s most important historic site
Photos from the Cabrits National Park

National parks of Dominica
Protected areas established in 1986
Peninsulas of Dominica
1986 establishments in Dominica